Starz  is the debut studio album by the American hard rock band Starz. The album was released on June 21, 1976 on Capitol Records and produced by Jack Douglas (best known for his work with the American hard rock band Aerosmith).

The song "Pull the Plug" caused some controversy, because it is about a man disconnecting his comatose wife's life support.

Reception

AllMusic's Rob Theakston described Starz as "a simple, catchy, riff-driven album from start to finish", which failed in promoting the band to the level of arena rock stars like Aerosmith and Kiss; he judged the album "a mediocre debut, to be sure, and definitely not the release for casual fans to introduce themselves to the group." Canadian journalist Martin Popoff commented on the lack of success of Starz, writing that it "was perceived as a happy collection of harmless, corporate-vetted, summertime rock 'n' roll, marketed heavily and unfairly as state-of-the-art American hard rock", but concluded that the album aged quite well and is a good representation of "rock 'n' roll's friendlier, more relaxed, more optimistic eras."

Track listing

Personnel
Starz
Michael Lee Smith – vocals
Richie Ranno – guitar
Brendan Harkin – guitar
Pieter "Pete" Sweval – bass
Joe X. Dube (aka Jeff Grob) – drums

Additional musicians
Gary Coleman – additional percussion

Production
Jack Douglas – producer
John Jansen, Jay Messina – engineers
Sam Ginsberg – assistant engineer

References

External links
Official band website
Interview with Richie Ranno
Interview with Starz guitarist Richie Ranno

1976 debut albums
Capitol Records albums
Albums produced by Jack Douglas (record producer)
Starz (band) albums